The NYC Department of Small Business Services (SBS) is a department of the government of New York City that helps unlock economic potential and create economic security for all New Yorkers by connecting them to good jobs, creating stronger businesses, and building thriving neighborhoods across the five boroughs. Its regulations are compiled in title 66 of the New York City Rules.
SBS also issues waterfront construction permits.

SBS’ programming falls under three main categories: careers, businesses, and neighborhoods.

References

External links
 NYC Department of Small Business Services
 Department of Small Business Services in the Rules of the City of New York

Small Business Services